Watling Academy is a coeducational secondary school located in the Whitehouse area of Milton Keynes, in the English county of Buckinghamshire.

History
Construction of the school began in 2019, in anticipation of the planned demand for secondary school places from the large new developments on the western side of the city; the £40 million project to construct the school is on a  site. The school formally opened on a temporary site in September 2020, and occupation of the new buildings began in June 2021.

The school today
Watling Academy is a free school, and is part of the Denbigh Alliance Multi Academy Trust, which also operates Denbigh School in Shenley Church End.

References

External links

Free schools in England
Secondary schools in Milton Keynes
Educational institutions established in 2020
2020 establishments in England